Lando is a rural unincorporated community in Chester County, South Carolina, United States and a former textile village. Lando has a post office with the ZIP Code of 29724; the population of the ZCTA for 29724 was 89 at the 2000 census.

History 
Settled in the 1760s, and called Walker's Mill, the future Lando was a prime location for watermills along Fishing Creek. For most of the 20th century, the main employer in the village was Manetta Mills, one of the largest blanket makers in the world. After the mill closed in 1991, Lando lost most of its population, going from about 2000 to about 20 who still live in town. The Lando School was listed on the National Register of Historic Places in 2009.

Sources 
http://landomanettamillshistorycenter.com/
http://www.nationalregister.sc.gov/chester/S10817712018/index.htm
http://www.amazon.com/gp/product/0738552682

References

External links
Lando Manetta Mills History Center
Lando History Center - Lando Cotton Mill Site

Unincorporated communities in Chester County, South Carolina
Unincorporated communities in South Carolina